Indonesia competed at the 1984 Summer Olympics in Los Angeles, United States.  The nation returned to the Olympic Games after participating in the American-led boycott of the 1980 Summer Olympics.

Competitors 
The following is the list of number of competitors participating in the Games:

Archery 
 

In Indonesia's third Olympic archery competition, two men competed.  This included 1976 veteran Donald Pandiangan.

Men's Individual Competition:
 Suradi Rukimin - 2485 points (16th place)
 Donald Pandiangan - 2374 points (43rd place)

Athletics 
 

 Key
 Note–Ranks given for track events are within the athlete's heat only
 Q = Qualified for the next round
 q = Qualified for the next round as a fastest loser or, in field events, by position without achieving the qualifying target
 NR = National record
 N/A = Round not applicable for the event
 Bye = Athlete not required to compete in round

Boxing

Shooting 

Women's Sporting Pistol 25 metres
 Lely Sampoerno - 572 points, 15 place
Selvyana Adrian-Sofyan - 559 points, 28 place

Swimming

Weightlifting

See also
 1984 Olympic Games
 1984 Paralympic Games
 Indonesia at the Olympics
 Indonesia at the Paralympics
 Indonesia at the 1984 Summer Paralympics

References 
Official Olympic Reports

Nations at the 1984 Summer Olympics
1984
1984 in Indonesian sport